Messenger Kids is a messaging app and platform released by Meta Platforms in December 2017. The platform is designed for a young audience as a safer alternative to the Messenger platform. Users can register with their first and last names instead of phone numbers. It was initially launched for iPad tablets with the iOS operating system in the United States only, though later support for iPhone and Android devices was added and it was rolled out in Canada, Peru, and Mexico. 

Parents have oversight and control, with requirements about identity verification and approval of contacts. It features augmented reality filters and lenses, along with games and educational content.

Criticism 

While the app was certified by the Children's Online Privacy Protection Act (COPPA), it received significant criticism and concern, primarily due to it collecting the contents of messages and photos sent by minors, as well as for trying to get people hooked into the Facebook experience at a very young age. UK's Secretary of Health Jeremy Hunt publicly criticized the initiative, tweeting that the company should "stay away from my kids" and "Facebook told me they would come back with ideas to PREVENT underage use of their product, but instead they are actively targeting younger children".

References

2017 software
Internet properties established in 2017
Kids
Android (operating system) software
IOS software
Children's entertainment